Alfred Denis Godley (22 January 1856 – 27 June 1925) was an Anglo-Irish classical scholar and author of humorous poems.  From 1910 to 1920 he was Public Orator at the University of Oxford, a post that involved composing citations in Latin for the recipients of honorary degrees.  One of these was for Thomas Hardy who received an Honorary D. Litt. in 1920, and whose treatment of rural themes Godley compared to Virgil.

He is known for his humorous verse, including macaronic pieces such as The Motor Bus, in which the English phrase "motor bus" is declined as though it were Latin.  He was a contributor to several periodicals, especially The Oxford Magazine, which he edited from 1890, and published several collections of his poems.

Godley's published works include:
 Verses to Order (1892)
 Aspects of Modern Oxford (1894)
 Socrates and Athenian Society in His Day (1896)
 Lyra Frivola (1899)
 Second Strings (1902)
 Oxford in the Eighteenth Century (1908)
 The Casual Ward (1912)
 Reliquiae A. D. Godley (1926)

He also published translations of Herodotus (1921) and Horace's Odes (1898).

Godley was a first-cousin of The 1st Baron Kilbracken, who, as Sir Arthur Godley, was the long-serving Permanent Under-Secretary of State for India.

References

External links 
 
 
 
 
 

English classical scholars
1856 births
1925 deaths
People from County Leitrim
English male poets